Builders is a 1942 British propaganda film, which outlines the importance of the work of builders during the Second World War. It was produced by Ian Dalrymple at the Crown Film Unit of the Ministry of Information and directed by Pat Jackson.

The eight-minute film is structured as a dialogue between the builders and an off-screen narrator, a technique developed in the 1935 British social documentary film Housing Problems.

It was one of many films produced to improve civilian morale.

References

External links
 Builders at BFI Screenonline

Crown Film Unit films
1942 films
British black-and-white films